Haratin, also referred to as Haratine, Harratin (singular: Hartani), are an  ethnic group found in western Sahel and southwestern Maghreb. The Haratin are mostly found in modern Mauritania (where they form a plurality), Morocco, Western Sahara, and Algeria. In Tunisia and Libya, they are referred to as Shwashin, Chouachin, Chouachine (singular: Shwashin, Chouchan).

The Haratin are both culturally and ethnically distinct from modern sub-Saharan Africans and speak Maghrebi Arabic dialects as well as various Berber languages. They have traditionally been characterised as the descendants of former Sub-Saharan slaves.

They form the single largest defined ethnolinguistic group in Mauritania where they account for 40% of the population (~1.5 million). In parts of Arab-Berber Maghreb, they are sometimes referred to as a "socially distinct class of workers". 

The Haratin have been, and still commonly are socially isolated in some Maghrebi countries, living in segregated, Haratin-only ghettos. They are commonly perceived as an endogamous group of former slaves or descendants of slaves. They favourably adopted Islam under the Arabs and Berbers and were forcibly recruited into the Moroccan army by Ismail Ibn Sharif (Sultan of Morocco from 1672–1727) to consolidate power.

Traditionally, many Haratin have held occupations in agriculture – as serfs, herdsmen, and indentured workers.

Etymology 
The origin and meaning of the name Haratin (singular Hartani) is controversial. Some claim that it comes from the Berber word ahardan (pl. ihardin) referring to skin color, more specifically "dark color". This word is absent from the Arabic language and has been used by the Sanhaja tribe and Zenata tribe before the arrival of the Beni Ḥassān. Others claim it comes from the Arabic phrase al-Hurr al-Thani or second class (second group of free people). Neither of these claims have much proof.

History 

The Haratin form an ethnic group distinct from Arab and Tuareg populations, as well as from the contemporary ethnic groups of sub-Saharan Africa. However, in countries such as Morocco, they are sometimes classified either as Berber or Arab, depending on their language and society they are found in. In Mauritania, however, where there are nearly 1.5 million Haratin, they have developed a separate sense of ethnic identity.

During the Roman occupation of Mauretania, the Godala Berber tribe fled to the south towards the Draa oasis and enslaved the local Haratin population. They have historically inherited their slave status and family occupation, have been endogamous, and socially segregated. Some communities differentiated two types of slaves, one called 'Abid or "slave" and Haratin or "freed slave". However, per anthropologist John Shoup, both 'Abid and Haratin were not free to own land or had equivalent property rights. Regardless of whether they were technically free or not, they were treated as socially inferior in the communities they lived in. Being denied the right and the ability to own any land, they historically survived by accepting a patron-client serf relationship either as domestic servant or as share-cropping labor (khammasin).

They became a common target of mandatory conscription by the Moroccan ruler Ismail Ibn Sharif as he sought to build a military that had no social or cultural attachment to any other Arab or Berber group in Maghreb. He conscripted the majority of able-bodied male Haratin and 'Abid that were present in Morocco at the time. This army was then commonly coerced into a series of wars in order to consolidate Ibn Sharif's power.

Haratin communities

Mauritania

In Mauritania, the Haratin form one of the largest ethnic groups and account for as much as 40% of the Mauritanians. They are sometimes referred to as "Black Moors", in contrast to Beidane, or "White Moors". The Haratin there are primarily Hassaniya Arabic.

The Haratin of Mauritania, according to anthropologist Joseph Hellweg, who specializes in West African studies, were historically part of a social caste-like hierarchy that likely developed from a Bedouin legacy between the 14th and 16th century. The "Hassan" monopolized the occupations related to war and politics, the "Zwaya" (Zawaya) the religious roles, the "Bidan" (White Moors) owned property and held slaves (Haratins, Black Moors). Each of these were immovable castes, endogamous, with hereditary occupations and where the upper strata collected tribute (horma) from the lower strata of Mauritanian society, considered them socially inferior, and denied them the right to own land or weapons thereby creating a socio-economically closed system.

In 1960, Mauritania officially abolished slavery, and made another update to its slavery law in 1981. However, even after the formalities, abolishment, and new laws, discrimination against Haratin is still widespread, and many continue to be, for all practical purposes, enslaved, while large numbers live in other forms of informal dependence on their former masters.

Amnesty International reported that in 1994 90,000 Haratine still lived as "property" of their master, with the report indicating that "slavery in Mauritania is most dominant within the traditional upper class of the Moors." According to Mauritanian officials, any master-serf relationship is mutually consensual. This position has been questioned by the United Nations and human rights advocacy groups.

The Amnesty International report states that "[s]ocial attitudes have changed among most urban Moors, but in rural areas, the ancient divide is still very alive." There have been many attempts to assess the real extension of slavery in modern Mauritania, but these have mostly been frustrated by the Nouakchott government's official stance that the practice has been eliminated. Amnesty further estimated that some 300,000 freed slaves continued to be in service of their former masters.

On 27 April 2007 Messaoud Ould Boulkheir was elected speaker of the National Assembly, becoming the first black Haratin to hold the position.

Morocco
Haratin in Morocco are mostly concentrated in the southern part of the Drâa-Tafilalet region, specifically towns such as Zagora where they make up a significant portion of the populace.

Haratin have been the slave strata of the Moroccan society through its recorded history. They were owned in every town and farming center before the time of Moroccan ruler Ismail Ibn Sharif. They provided domestic labor, farm labor, physical labor inside towns and markets, as well as were conscripted to fight wars.

According to Remco Ensel – a professor of anthropology specializing in Maghreb studies, the word "Haratin" in Moroccan is a pejorative that connotes "subordination, disrepute" and in contemporary literature; it is often replaced with "Drawi", "Drawa", "Sahrawi", "Sahrawa", or other regional terms. The Moroccan Haritin, states Chouki El Hamel, a professor of history specializing in African Studies, are the diaspora of black West Africans who were forcefully transported across the Sahara and sold in Moroccan slave markets over centuries. They absorbed the "Arabo-centric values in the dominant interpretation of Islam", states El Hamel, over the generations and they see themselves as Muslim Moroccans, rather than by their ethnic or native group.

The Haratin strata, as slave workers, were a major institution of Moroccan society through the 19th century. Yet, there has been a general lack of historical records about their origins and ethnography, leading to several constructed proposals, and their mention in older Moroccan literature is generally limited to their status as slaves and more focused on the rights on their owners. It is their contemporary economic and social marginalization that has awakened renewed interest in their history and their oral histories.

The Haratins remain indispensable workers in modern oases societies, states Ensel, and continue to be mistreated in contrast to the upper strata called the "Shurfa". According to Remco Ensel, Haratin, along with Swasin in Morocco and other northern fringe societies of the Sahara, were a part of a social hierarchy that included the upper strata of nobles, religious specialists, and literati, followed by freemen, nomadic pastoral strata, and slaves. The Haratin were hierarchically higher than the 'Abid (descendant of slaves) at the very bottom, but lower than Ahrar. This hierarchy, states Ensel, has been variously described as ethnic groups, estates, quasi-castes, castes, or classes.

The Haratins historically lived segregated from the main society, in a rural isolation. Their subjugation was sometimes ideologically justified by nobles and some religious scholars, even though others disagreed. The social stratification of Haratin and their inter-relationships with others members of the society varied by valley and oasis, but whether the Haratins were technically 'unfreed, semi-freed, or freed' slaves, they were considered as "inferior" by other strata of the society. The Haratin remain a marginalized population of Morocco, just like other similar groups around the world.

Western Sahara
According to Human Rights Watch, Morocco alleges that slavery is widespread in the Sahrawi refugee camps run by the Polisario Front in southwestern Algeria; Polisario denies this and claims to have eradicated slavery through awareness campaigns. A 2009 investigative report by Human Rights Watch interviewed some dark-skinned Sahrawi people, who are a small minority in the camps; they stated that some "blacks" are "owned" by "whites" but this ownership is manifested only in "granting" marriage rights to girls. In other words, a dark-skinned girl must have an approval from her "master". Without this, the marriage can not be performed by a qadi.

The report notes that Polisario claims to oppose any such discrimination, but raises questions about possible official collusion in, or indifference to, the practice. In addition, a case of an official document that grants freedom to a group of enslaved families has been found by HRW. The document in question dates as recently as 2007. The document was signed by a local judge or an official civil servant. Slavery is still engraved in memories due to historical and traditional reasons, and such cases are not as shocking as one might think to the society of the Sahrawi refugee camps. The Human Rights Watch concludes its chapter on slavery as follows, "In sum, credible sources testified to Human Rights Watch about vestiges of slavery that continue to affect the lives of a portion of the black minority in the Tindouf camps. The practices involve historical ties between families that involve certain rights and obligations that are not always clear. Being a slave does not necessarily preclude enjoying freedom of movement."

Responding to questions about slavery, the Polisario has acknowledged the survival "to a limited extent, of certain practices related to antiquated thinking" and said it was "determined to combat and eradicate them whenever they emerge and no matter what shape they take." "We welcome this statement and urge the Polisario to be vigilant in pursuing this objective," said HRW.

Algeria
In the Algerian Sahara, the Haratin, who were marginalized by France during colonization, experienced social and political progress after the country's independence. This integration had started during the war of liberation; a discourse of emancipation and the absence of state racism, which constitutes a tradition of Algerian nationalism, had succeeded in mobilizing this social category. Social success through education allowed the former Haratin to be represented in local communities and to access the most influential positions.

References

Bibliography
 
 
 
 

 
 Amnesty International, 7 November 2002, Mauritania, A future free from slavery? The formal abolition of slavery in 1981 has not led to real and effective abolition for various reasons, including a lack of legislation to ensure its implementation.

External links

Slavery in Africa
Ethnic groups in Tunisia
Ethnic groups in Algeria
Ethnic groups in Mauritania
Ethnic groups in Morocco
Ethnic groups in Western Sahara
Ethnic groups in Libya
Members of the Unrepresented Nations and Peoples Organization
Moroccan people
Mauritanian people
Algerian people
Libyan people
Tunisian people
Sub-Saharan people